Chile competed at the 1998 Winter Olympics in Nagano, Japan.

Alpine skiing

Men

Men's combined

References 
 Official Olympic Reports
 Olympic Winter Games 1998, full results by sports-reference.com

Nations at the 1998 Winter Olympics
1998
Winter Olympics